The Lucky Toothache is a 1910 silent film short directed by Frank Powell and starring Mary Pickford and Mack Sennett. It was produced and distributed by the Biograph Company.

The film survives because it was transferred by the Library of Congress from a paper print.

Cast
Mary Pickford - Bessie
Mack Sennett - Tom
Kate Bruce - Bessie's Mother
W. Chrystie Miller - Bessie's Father

Unbilled
Linda Arvidson
Charles Craig - One of the  Boys
Edward Dillon - One of the Boys
Dell Henderson
Fred Mace
Claire McDowell - A Cousin
Billy Quirk
Charles West - One of the Boys

References

External links
 The Lucky Toothache at IMDb.com

1910 films
1910 short films
American silent short films
Biograph Company films
American black-and-white films
Films directed by Frank Powell
1910s American films